is a railway station in the city of Tokoname, Aichi, Japan, operated by Meitetsu.

Lines

Station layout
The station has two opposed side platforms connected by a footbridge. The station has automated ticket machines, Manaca automated turnstiles and it is unattended.

Platforms

Adjacent stations

Station history
Kabaike Station was opened on June 19, 1913 as a station on the Aichi Electric Railway Company. The Aichi Electric Railway became part of the Meitetsu group on August 1, 1935. The station has been unattended since February 1968. In January 2005, the Tranpass system of magnetic fare cards with automatic turnstiles was implemented.

Passenger statistics
In fiscal 2016, the station was used by an average of 1,232 passengers daily (boarding passengers only).

Surrounding area
Tokoname High School

See also
 List of Railway Stations in Japan

References

External links

 Official web page 

Railway stations in Japan opened in 1913
Railway stations in Aichi Prefecture
Stations of Nagoya Railroad
Tokoname